Chantal Gallia (born Chantal Halimi; 8 December 1956 – 10 July 2022) was an Algerian-born French singer, humorist, and impersonator.

Biography
In 1978, she held a small role in the film , directed by Nicole de Buron.

In the 1990s, Gallia collaborated with Thierry Sforza to write the script for her show J'annonce, j'abats, shown at the Théâtre de la Renaissance in 1992.

Chantal Gallia died of a stroke in Paris on 10 July 2022, aged 65.

Discography
Naître ou ne pas naître (1976)
Pas d'mari pour Mimi (1976)
Amoureusement vôtre (1977)
Tout un programme ! (1977)
La chanteuse noire (1978)
Slow nu (1978)
Disco cloche (1980)
S.O.S...je suis là (1980)
La salsaméricain (1983)
Bidon (1983)
La mémoire qui chante (1987)

References

External Links
 
 

1956 births
2022 deaths 
People from Constantine, Algeria
20th-century French women singers
French humorists
French people of Algerian descent
20th-century French women
21st-century French women